San Miguel Amatitlán is a town and municipality in Oaxaca in south-western Mexico. The municipality covers an area of 198.48 km². 
It is part of the Huajuapan District in the north of the Mixteca Region.

As of 2005, the municipality had a total population of 5938.

References

Municipalities of Oaxaca